Gordon County may refer to:

 Gordon County, Georgia, United States
 Gordon County, New South Wales, Australia